Richfield Township may refer to:

 Richfield Township, Adams County, Illinois
 Richfield Township, Morton County, Kansas, in Morton County, Kansas
 Richfield Township, Genesee County, Michigan
 Richfield Township, Roscommon County, Michigan
 Richfield Township, Henry County, Ohio
 Richfield Township, Lucas County, Ohio
 Richfield Township, Summit County, Ohio
 Richfield Township, Spink County, South Dakota, in Spink County, South Dakota

Township name disambiguation pages